This is a list of the kings and queens of Aragon. The Kingdom of Aragon was created sometime between 950 and 1035 when the County of Aragon, which had been acquired by the Kingdom of Navarre in the tenth century, was separated from Navarre in accordance with the will of King Sancho III (1004–35). In 1164, the marriage of the Aragonese princess Petronila (Kingdom of Aragon) and the Catalan count Ramon Berenguer IV (County of Barcelona) created a dynastic union from which what modern historians call the Crown of Aragon was born. In the thirteenth century the kingdoms of Valencia, Majorca and Sicily were added to the Crown, and in the fourteenth the Kingdom of Sardinia and Corsica. The Crown of Aragon continued to exist until 1713 when its separate constitutional systems (Catalan Constitutions, Aragon Fueros, and Furs of Valencia) were swept away in the Nueva Planta decrees at the end of the War of the Spanish Succession.

Jiménez dynasty, 1035–1164
With the death of Sancho III of Pamplona, Aragon was inherited by his son Ramiro as an autonomous state.

House of Barcelona, 1164–1410

|Alfonso II18 July 1164 – 25 April 1196||||1157Huescason of Ramon Berenguer IV of Barcelona and Petronilla of Aragon||Sancha of Castile7 children||25 April 1196Perpignanaged 44
|-
|Peter II25 April 1196 – 13 September 1213||||1178Huescason of Alfonso II and Sancha of Castile||Maria of Montpellier15 June 1204 2 children||12 September 1213Battle of Muretaged approximately 35
|-
|James I13 September 1213 – 27 July 1276||||2 February 1208Montpellierson of Peter II and Maria of Montpellier||Eleanor of Castile12211 childViolant of Hungary123510 childrenTeresa Gil de Vidaure2 children||27 July 1276Valenciaaged 68
|-
|Peter III27 July 1276 – 2 November 1285||||1240Valenciason of James I and Violant of Hungary||Constance of Sicily13 June 12626 children||2 November 1285Vilafranca del Penedèsaged 45
|-
|Alfonso III2 November 1285 – 18 June 1291||||1265Valenciason of Peter III and Constance of Sicily||Eleanor of England15 August 1290No children||18 June 1291Barcelonaaged 27
|-
|James II18 June 1291 – 2 November 1327||||10 August 1267Valenciason of Peter III and Constance of Sicily||Isabella of Castile1 December 1291 No childrenBlanche of Anjou29 October 129510 childrenMarie de Lusignan15 June 1315 No childrenElisenda de Montcada25 December 1322 No children||5 November 1327Barcelonaaged 60
|-
|Alfonso IV2 November 1327 – 24 January 1336||||1299Naplesson of James II and Blanche of Anjou||Teresa d'Entença13147 childrenEleanor of Castile2 children||27 January 1336Barcelonaaged 37
|-
|Peter IV24 January 1336 – 5 January 1387||||5 October 1319Balaguerson of Alfonso IV and Teresa d'Entença||Maria of Navarre13382 children Eleanor of Portugal1347No childrenEleanor of Sicily4 children||5 January 1387Barcelonaaged 68
|-
|John I5 January 1387 – 19 May 1396||||27 December 1350Perpignanson of Peter IV and Eleanor of Sicily||Martha of Armagnac1 childYolande of Bar3 children||19 May 1396Foixàaged 46
|-
|Martin19 May 1396 – 31 May 1410||||1356Gironason of Peter IV and Eleanor of Sicily||Maria de Luna13 June 13724 childrenMargaret of Prades1409No children||31 May 1410Barcelonaaged 54
|-
|}

House of Trastámara, 1412–1555

|-
|Ferdinand I the Honest24 June 1412 – 2 April 1416||||27 November 1380Medina del Camposon of John I of Castile and Eleanor of Aragon||Eleanor of Alburquerque13948 children||2 April 1416Igualadaaged 36
|-
|Alfonso V the Magnanimous2 April 1416 – 27 June 1458||||1396Medina del Camposon of Ferdinand I and Eleanor of Alburquerque||Maria of Castile1415No children||27 June 1458Naplesaged 52
|-
|John II the Great27 June 1458 – 19 January 1479||||29 June 1398Medina del Camposon of Ferdinand I and Eleanor of Alburquerque||Blanche I of Navarre6 November 14194 childrenJuana Enríquez2 children||20 January 1479Barcelonaaged 81
|-
|Ferdinand II the Catholic19 January 1479 – 23 January 1516||||10 March 1452son of John II and Juana Enríquez||Isabella I of Castile19 October 14695 childrenGermaine of Foix1505No children||23 January 1516Madrigalejoaged 63
|-
|Joanna of Castile23 January 1516 – 12 April 1555||||6 November 1479daughter of Ferdinand II and Isabella I||Philip of Austria20 October 14966 children||12 April 1555Tordesillasaged 75
|-
|}
Nominally co-monarch of her son Charles I, Joanna I was confined for alleged insanity during her whole reign.

Claimants against John II, 1462–1472
During the Catalan Civil War, there were three who claimed his throne, though this never included the Kingdom of Valencia.

|-
|Henry IV of Castile(claimant)House of Trastámara1462–1463||||5 January 1425Valladolidson of John II of Castile and Maria of Aragon||Joan of Portugal14551 child||11 December 1474Madridaged 49
|-
|Peter V of Aragon(claimant)House of Aviz1463–1466||||1429son of Peter, Duke of Coimbra and Isabella of Urgell||never married||1466Granollersaged 37
|-
|René(claimant)House of Valois-Anjou1466–1472||||16 January 1409Château d'Angersson of Louis II of Anjou and Yolande of Aragon||Isabella, Duchess of Lorraine142010 childrenJeanne de Laval10 September 1454No children||10 July 1480Aix-en-Provenceaged 71
|-
|}

House of Habsburg, 1516–1700

|-
|Charles I the Emperor23 January 1516 – 16 January 1556||||24 February 1500Ghentson of Philip I of Castile and Joanna of Castile||Isabella of Portugal10 March 15263 children||21 September 1558Yusteaged 58
|-
|Philip I the Prudent16 January 1556 – 13 September 1598||||21 May 1527Valladolidson of Charles I and Isabella of Portugal||Maria of Portugal15431 childMary I of England1554No childrenElisabeth of Valois15592 childrenAnna of Austria4 May 15705 children||13 September 1598Madridaged 71
|-
|Philip II the Pious13 September 1598 – 31 March 1621||||14 April 1578Madridson of Philip I and Anna of Austria||Margaret of Austria18 April 15995 children||31 March 1621Madridaged 42
|-
|Philip III the Great31 March 1621 – 17 September 1665||||8 April 1605Valladolidson of Philip II and Margaret of Austria||Elisabeth of France16157 childrenMariana of Austria16495 children||17 September 1665Madridaged 60
|-
|Charles II the Bewitched17 September 1665 – 1 November 1700||||6 November 1661Madridson of Philip III and Mariana of Austria||Marie Louise of Orléans19 November 1679No childrenMaria Anna of Neuburg14 May 1690No children||1 November 1700Madridaged 38
|-
|}
Aragon itself stayed loyal to Philip IV during the Reapers' War while Catalonia switched allegiance to Louis XIII and Louis XIV the Sun-King (see List of Counts of Barcelona). Portugal seceded in 1640. Charles II died without heirs.

House of Bourbon, 1700–1705

|-
|Philip IV the Spirited1 November 1700 – 1705||||19 December 1683Versaillesson of Louis, Grand Dauphin and Maria Anna Victoria of Bavaria||Maria Luisa Gabriella of Savoy2 November 17014 childrenElisabeth Farnese24 December 17147 children||9 July 1746Madridaged 62
|-
|}

House of Habsburg, 1705–1714

|-
|Charles III the Archduke1705–1714||||1 October 1685Viennason of Leopold I, Holy Roman Emperor and Eleonore Magdalene of Neuburg||Elisabeth Christine1 August 17084 children||20 October 1740Viennaaged 55
|-
|}

During the war (officially in 1707) Philip V of Spain, the first of the Bourbon dynasty in Spain, disbanded the Crown of Aragon. After this time, there are no more Aragonese monarchs. Nevertheless, Spanish monarchs up to Isabella II, while styling themselves king/queen of Spain on coins, still used some of the traditional nomenclature of the defunct Crown of Aragon in their official documents: ''King/Queen of Castile, Leon, Aragon, both Sicilies, Jerusalem, Navarra, Granada, Toledo, Valencia, Galicia, Majorca, Sevilla, Sardinia, Cordova, Corsica, Murcia, Jaen, the Algarve, Algeciras, Gibraltar, the Canary Islands, the Eastern & Western Indias, the Islands & Mainland of the Ocean sea; Archduke of Austria; Duke of Burgundy, Brabant, Milan; Count of Habsburg, Flanders, Tyrol, Barcelona Lord of Biscay, Molina'.

See also
List of Asturian monarchs
List of Castilian monarchs
List of Galician monarchs
List of Leonese monarchs
List of Navarrese monarchs
List of Majorcan monarchs
List of Valencian monarchs
List of Spanish monarchs
Counts of Barcelona
Kings of Spain family tree

References

External links
 

 
Lists of Spanish monarchs
.
.